France–Nepal relations is the bilateral relationship between France and Nepal.

France–Nepal relations were officially established on 20 April 1949.

References

External links
 

 
Bilateral relations of Nepal
Nepal